Part of the Light is the seventh studio album by Ray LaMontagne, released on May 18, 2018, via RCA Records. "Such a Simple Thing" was released as the lead single.

Reception

Part of the Light received generally favorable reviews from critics. At Metacritic, which assigns a normalized rating out of 100 to reviews from mainstream publications, the album received an average score of 74 based on 7 reviews.

Track listing
All songs written by Ray LaMontagne.
"To the Sea"
"Paper Man"
"Part of the Light"
"It's Always Been You"
"Let's Make It Last"
"As Black as Blood Is Blue"
"Such a Simple Thing"
"No Answer Arrives"
"Goodbye Blue Sky"

Charts

References

2018 albums
Ray LaMontagne albums
RCA Records albums